Staniliya Stamenova (born 2 June 1988) is a Bulgarian sprint canoer and former athletics competitor. She won the gold medal in the C-1 200 m event at the 2015 ICF Canoe Sprint World Championships in Milan and has won the gold in the same event at the Canoe Sprint European Championships three times, in 2012, 2014, and 2015.

References

Bulgarian female canoeists
Living people
1988 births
ICF Canoe Sprint World Championships medalists in Canadian
European Games competitors for Bulgaria
Canoeists at the 2019 European Games
Canoeists at the 2020 Summer Olympics
Olympic canoeists of Bulgaria